The 2023 World Judo Championships will be held at the Ali Bin Hamad al-Attiyah Arena in Doha, Qatar, from 7 to 14 May 2023 as part of the IJF World Tour and during the 2024 Summer Olympics qualification period, concluding with a mixed team event on its final day.

Prize money
The sums written are per medalist, bringing the total prizes awarded to €798,000 for the individual events and €200,000 for the team event.

References

External links
 

World Judo Championships
World Championships
World Championships
Judo World Championships
Judo competitions in Qatar
Sports competitions in Doha
Judo World Championships
Judo World Championships